Conor Elliott (born October 10, 1988 in London, Ontario) is a retired Canadian football long snapper and linebacker for the Toronto Argonauts of the Canadian Football League. He was drafted 44th overall by the Argonauts in the 2010 CFL Draft and signed with the team on May 25, 2010. He played college football for the Western Ontario Mustangs. He announced his retirement on June 10, 2010. He also was a former teacher for Wilton Grove Public School in London, Ontario. He taught grade 6 for 1 year.

References

1988 births
Canadian football long snappers
Living people
Players of Canadian football from Ontario
Sportspeople from London, Ontario
Toronto Argonauts players
Western Mustangs football players